António Fernando Barbosa da Silva (born 3 November 1931), known simply as Barbosa, is a Portuguese former footballer who played as a defender and made two appearances for the Portugal national team.

Career
Barbosa made his international debut for Portugal on 16 May 1959 in a friendly match against Switzerland, which finished as a 3–4 loss. He made his second and final appearance five days later against Sweden in another friendly, which finished as a 0–2 loss.

Career statistics

International

References

External links
 
 
 

1931 births
Living people
Footballers from Porto
Portuguese footballers
Portugal international footballers
Portugal B international footballers
Association football defenders
Boavista F.C. players
FC Porto players
Primeira Liga players
Segunda Divisão players